Pak Yong-ho (born May 29, 1974) is a former South Korean football player.

Club statistics

References

External links

1974 births
Living people
South Korean footballers
South Korean expatriate footballers
J2 League players
Japan Football League (1992–1998) players
Sagan Tosu players
Expatriate footballers in Japan
South Korean expatriate sportspeople in Japan
Association football defenders